Symbolic culture, or nonmaterial culture, is the ability to learn and transmit behavioral traditions from one generation to the next by the invention of things that exist entirely in the symbolic realm. Symbolic culture is usually conceived as the cultural realm constructed and inhabited uniquely by Homo sapiens and is differentiated from ordinary culture, which many other animals possess. Symbolic culture is studied by archaeologists, social anthropologists and sociologists. From 2018, however, some evidence of a Neanderthal origin of symbolic culture emerged. Symbolic culture contrasts with material culture, which involves physical entities of cultural value and includes the usage, consumption, creation, and trade of objects.

Examples of symbolic culture include concepts (such as good and evil), mythical inventions (such as gods and underworlds), and social constructs (such as promises and football games).
Symbolic culture is a domain of objective facts whose existence depends, paradoxically, on collective belief.  A currency system, for example, exists only for as long as people continue to have faith in it. When confidence in monetary facts collapses, the "facts" themselves suddenly disappear. Much the same applies to citizenship, government, marriage and many other things that people in our own culture consider to be "real". The concept of symbolic culture draws from semiotics, and emphasises the way in which distinctively human culture is mediated through signs and concepts. In sociology, Emile Durkheim, Claude Lévi-Strauss, Clifford Geertz and many others have emphasised the symbolic aspect of distinctively human culture.

Evolutionary emergence

From a Darwinian standpoint, symbolic culture has proved hard to explain. One difficulty is that the concept itself often seems unsettling and philosophically unacceptable to natural scientists. Modern science became established in opposition to the idea that culturally accepted fictions can be equated with facts. Yet the concept of symbolic culture requires us to grasp just that paradoxical possibility. Long before the late twentieth century invention of the Internet, evolution allowed humans to flit between two realms, reality on the one hand, virtual reality on the other. Symbolic culture is an environment of virtual entities lacking counterparts in the real world.

It was once thought that art and symbolic culture first emerged in Europe some 40,000 years ago, during the Middle-to-Upper Palaeolithic transition – often termed the 'symbolic explosion' or 'Upper Palaeolithic revolution'. Some archaeologists still adhere to this view. Others now accept that symbolic culture probably emerged in sub-Saharan Africa at a much earlier date, during the period known as the Middle Stone Age. The evidence consists of traditions of ground ochre with strong selection for the colour red, examples of so-called ochre 'crayons' which appear to have been used for purposes of design, probably on the body, and geometric engravings on blocks of ochre. All this apparently formed part of a cosmetics industry dated to between 100,000 and 200,000 years ago. One theory is that this constitutes evidence for a ritual tradition. A bone apparently engraved with six lines from ~120 kya may be the earliest evidence of human use of symbols. In addition, from about 100,000 years ago, there are pierced shells which appear to show signs of wear, suggesting that they were strung together to make necklaces. 
The controversial theory of female cosmetic coalitions interprets the ochre tradition as evidence that the world's first art, as an aspect of symbolic culture, took the form of personal ornamentation and body-painting. It was initially countered that pigment-only decorative systems are merely individualistic display, not necessarily indicative of ritual, whereas the bead traditions testify to language, institutionalised relationships and full-scale ritual and symbolic culture. More recently, however, those making this criticism have conceded that the evidence for ochre pigment use, stretching back towards 300,000 years ago, must indeed be recognised as the earliest durable media testifying to a collective ritual tradition.

See also
 Behavioral modernity
 Ochre
 Prehistoric art
 Blombos Cave
 Origins of society
 Timeline of evolution
 The Human Revolution (human origins)

References

Anthropology
Symbolism